

Works

Births

Deaths
 Abdelaziz al-Malzuzi (born unknown), Moroccan poet of the Marinid period

13th-century poetry
Poetry